Carmen de figuris vel schematibus is a rhetoric work written in the 4th-5th century AD. It is a poem composed of 186 lines, discussing almost 60 figures of speeches. Its author is anonymous, but he surely was inspired by Alexander Numenius' and Publius Rutilius Lupus' treatises.

References

External links
Incerti auctoris de figuris vel schematibus versus heroici, F. G. Schneidewin (ed.), Gottingae, sumptibus G. Kuebleri, 1841.
Rhetores Latini minores, Karl Halm (ed.), Lipsiae in aedibus B. G. Teubneri, 1863, pp. 63-70.

Ancient Roman rhetoricians